Allesley Castle is a former motte and bailey castle in Allesley, Coventry. The mound has never been excavated. The ditch contains several concrete blocks which are thought to be bases for bridges over the motte. The site is a scheduled historical monument.

History
There is little documentary evidence for the history of the castle. It was possibly built as early as the 11th century or around 1140 (during the Anarchy) and it was probably ruined by 1387, but there is speculation that it may have been built in the 14th century by Lord Hastings, who built another fortification in Fillongley, seven miles away. It was seized from the estate of Robert Fitch in 1588 and it was probably in ruins by 1650. English Heritage believe the site contains artefacts which will reveal more about the construction and history of the castle.

References 

Motte-and-bailey castles
Castles in the West Midlands (county)